Edmund Henry Lacon Willes (7 July 1832 – 9 September 1896) was an English first-class cricketer who played in the 1850s and 1860s as a right-handed batsman who bowled right-arm roundarm fast. He became a Church of England cleric.

Willes was educated at Winchester College, where he represented the college cricket team, and at Oxford University, where he was an exhibitioner at Queen's College from 1850 to 1853, a scholar from 1854 to 1856 and a fellow from 1856 to 1865.

Cricket career
Willes played cricket for a variety of amateur teams over a period of 17 years. He made his first-class debut for a Hampshire team against an All-England Eleven in 1850. Between 1851 and 1854, he played for Oxford University, appearing three times in the University Match against Cambridge. He also appeared for amateur sides representing Kent between 1851 and 1855 and in one of these, a match between the Gentlemen of Kent and the Gentlemen of England in 1851, he scored 69, which was his highest first-class score. The following year, 1852, he took four Marylebone Cricket Club wickets in an innings for Oxford, though his precise figures are not recorded; this was the only time he took four wickets in an innings.

Ten years after his previous first-class appearance, Willes made his debut for Hampshire County Cricket Club against Middlesex in 1865, and he then played in two further games for MCC, one in each of the next two seasons. In Willes' overall first-class career he scored 416 runs at a batting average of 13.86; with the ball he took 20 wickets, though incomplete figures for several matches mean his average is not known.

Clerical career
Willes was an assistant master at Winchester College from 1860 to 1865 and rector of St Swithin's Church, Winchester from 1863 to 1865. He was then successively vicar at Helston, Cornwall and Ashby Magna in Leicestershire before being appointed rector of Monk Sherborne, Hampshire in 1887. From 1871 he was an honorary canon of Peterborough. He died at Monk Sherborne on 9 September 1896.

Family
Willes was the third surviving son of George Wickens Willes, a captain in the Royal Navy, by his wife Anne Elizabeth, daughter of Sir Edmund Lacon, 1st Baronet. His elder brother was Admiral George Ommanney Willes, Royal Navy Commander-in-Chief, Portsmouth.

Willes' distant cousin George Willes represented Cambridge University in five first-class matches.

References

External links

1832 births
1896 deaths
People from New Forest District
People educated at Winchester College
Alumni of The Queen's College, Oxford
English cricketers
Hampshire cricketers
Oxford University cricketers
Kent cricketers
Marylebone Cricket Club cricketers
Gentlemen of Kent cricketers
People from Basingstoke and Deane